Podlesie  is a settlement in the administrative district of Gmina Przeciszów, within Oświęcim County, Lesser Poland Voivodeship, in southern Poland.

References

Villages in Oświęcim County